BTI or Bti may refer to:

Acronyms
 Bacillus thuringiensis israelensis (Bti), a bacterium
 Barisan Tani Indonesia
 Baron Tornado Index of tornado probability
 Before the Impact, an American TV series
 Beverage Testing Institute
 Bicycle Technologies International, Santa Fe, New Mexico, US
 Boston Theological Institute
 Boyce Thompson Institute for Plant Research, Cornell University, Ithaca, New York, US
 Branch Target Injection or Spectre variant 2, a security vulnerability
 Breaking the Impasse, a Israel-Palestinian group
 Btrieve Technologies, Inc.
 Because the Internet, the second studio album by American singer Childish Gambino

Codes and symbols
 Barter Island LRRS Airport, Alaska, US, IATA airport code
 British American Tobacco PLC, NYSE symbol